The George Luckert House is an 1858 limestone house; one of the oldest homes in Saint Paul, Minnesota, United States. It is listed on the National Register of Historic Places.

References

Houses completed in 1858
Houses in Saint Paul, Minnesota
Houses on the National Register of Historic Places in Minnesota
National Register of Historic Places in Saint Paul, Minnesota
Federal architecture in Minnesota
Italianate architecture in Minnesota